Tribal Sports Management (TSM) is a Melbourne-based sports management company with offices in Australia and China and activity in North America and Europe. The company represents a number of sporting clubs and organizations. TSM offers services to the sports industry and corporate community,  including the following:

 Talent Representation 
 Sponsorship, Consulting, and Television Rights
 Sports Executive and Staff Recruitment
 International Club Matches, Tours, and Tournaments

The TSM managing director holds official FIFA player agent and matches agent licenses. TSM consults with a number of international corporations and football clubs on a range of services, from sponsorship to activation to brand management and strategies.

Clients
Some past and present clients of TSM:
 Scott McDonald - Australian footballer and Australian national team member, played club football for Celtic F.C. in Scotland, was the top goal scorer in championship winning season of 2007-2008
 Ryan McGowan - Australian football and Australian national team member, plays club football for Shandong Luneng Taishan in the Chinese Super League
 Shinji Ono - TSM was responsible for the Japanese superstar signing for Western Sydney Wanderers FC in the A-League
 Alessandro Del Piero - TSM was responsible for the Italian superstar signing for Sydney FC in the A-League in August 2012, making him the highest-paid footballer to ever play in Australia
 Dwight Yorke - TSM was responsible for signing the former Manchester United champion to Sydney FC in the inaugural A-League season 
 Benito Carbone - TSM was responsible for securing the Italian's guest appearance for Sydney FC in the A-League
 Kazu - TSM brought the Japanese legend to Sydney FC in the A-League 
 Brendon Santalab - Former Sydney FC striker now with Lifan FC in China
 Rostyn Griffiths - Former Blackburn Rovers and Central Coast Mariners FC midfielder now with Guangzhou R & F, China
 Pierre Littbarski - German World Cup winner was brought to Australia by TSM to coach Sydney FC in 2005/06 
 Terry Butcher - Former England captain brought to Australia by TSM to coach Sydney FC in 2006/07

International tour matches
International tour matches with TSM involvement:
 David Beckham & the LA Galaxy
 - 2007 v Sydney FC at ANZ Stadium in front of 80,000
 - 2007 v Wellington Phoenix FC at Westpac Stadium Wellington 30,000 fans
 - 2009 v Oceania All Stars that included Christian Karembeu and former Juventus star Edgar Davids
 - 2010 v Newcastle Jets FC at Energy Australia Stadium in front of 23,000 fans
 - 2011 v Melbourne Victory FC at Etihad Stadium in front of 31,000 that also included Republic of Ireland legend Robbie Keane 
 Celtic F.C. -  2009 & 2011
 Liverpool F.C. - 2013 
 Sydney FC - Pre-season tour in 2005 to Dubai that included games against Al Jazira and Al Ain

Achievements
Lou Sticca, the Managing Director of TSM was announced as one of the 10 most influential people in Australian Football for 2013 in the Herald Sun.

References

External links
 Official website

Companies based in Melbourne
Entertainment companies established in 2000
Sports management companies